Émile Maurice (8 July 1910-13 January 1993) was a French politician and a supporter of Martinique's assimilation to France. He was President of the General Council of Martinique from 1970 to 1992.

Biography 
Émile Maurice began his political career in 1957 when he was elected general councillor of Saint-Joseph. He was a co-founder of the Martinician Progressive Party with Aimé Césaire in 1958. He was elected mayor of Saint-Joseph in 1959, which he remained until his death in 1993.

In 1958, Maurice, who was a Gaullist, finding he disagreed with Aimé Césaire, left the PPM and joined the Union for the New Republic federation of Martinique. From then on, Émile Maurice opposed autonomism and, with Camille Petit and Victor Sablé, was one of the fiercest defenders of departmental status for Martinique.

He was president of the Rally for the Republic federation of Martinique for several years, and known as a pillar of the party.

Memorials 

A bust was dedicated to him in Saint-Joseph, and a street in Fort-de-France.

References 

Rally for the Republic politicians
Martiniquais politicians
20th-century French politicians
People from Le François

1910 births
1993 deaths
Presidents of French regions and overseas collectivities
Mayors of places in Martinique
Presidents of the General Council of Martinique